Gunjial is a village and one of the 51 Union Councils (administrative subdivisions) of Khushab District in the Punjab Province of Pakistan. The inhabitants are mostly Zameendars consisting of the Gunjail, Nutqal, and Balqal sub-castes of the Bhachar clan.

References

Union councils of Khushab District
Populated places in Khushab District